Pinkas haKehillot or Pinkas Ha-kehilot, (Hebrew: פנקס הקהילות; notebook of the [Jewish] communities; plural: Pinkasei haKehillot) Encyclopedia of Jewish Communities from Their Foundation till after the Holocaust,  is the name of each volume of a series presenting collected historical information and demographic data on Eastern European countries' Jewish communities, most of which were depopulated and whose populations were exterminated in the Holocaust. Pinkasei haKehillot is one of the most important projects undertaken by Yad Vashem in Jerusalem, concisely documenting this aspect of the history of the Holocaust.

Content
Each volume of Pinkas Hakehillot is produced geographically, with locale names in Yiddish as well as the local language's version. The content is composed of collected documents, lists, personal memoirs in their original unedited form, historical accounts and essays devoted to the life of Jewish communities from antiquity until the present, including maps and period photographs. The Pinkas attempts to illustrate "the life that once was and is no more".

The series, which was released over a few decades, has eleven parts: on Romania, Germany, Hungary, Poland, the Netherlands, Latvia & Estonia, Yugoslavia, Lithuania, Libya & Tunisia, Greece, and Slovakia.

Awards
In 1973, the project was awarded the Israel Prize, for its special contribution to society and the State.  It receives financial support from the Memorial Foundation for Jewish Culture.

Notes and references

History books about the Holocaust
Holocaust studies
Yad Vashem
Israel Prize for special contribution to society and the State recipients
Israel Prize recipients that are organizations